Georg Karl von Nostitz-Jänkendorf (1781—1838) was a German military officer in Imperial Russian service. A member of the Lausatian branch of the von Nostitz family, during the Napoleonic Wars in 1807 he joined the Russian Army and in a couple of years rose to the rank of major of the Russian–German Legion. For his service he received the Order of St. George (4th class) and was allowed to stay in the Russian army after the war had ended. Rising through the ranks, during the November Uprising he served as a Lieutenant-General and commanding officer of the 1st Light Horse Brigade of the Guards Cavalry Division. Distinguished during the Battle of Warsaw (1831), he received Order of St. George 3rd Class.

1781 births
1838 deaths
Imperial Russian Army generals
German expatriates in the Russian Empire
Russian military personnel of the Napoleonic Wars
Russian people of the November Uprising
Recipients of the Order of St. George of the Third Degree
Generals of the November Uprising